New Bedford is an unincorporated community and census-designated place (CDP) in Lawrence County, Pennsylvania, United States. The population was 925 at the 2010 census.

Geography
New Bedford is located in the northwestern corner of Lawrence County at  (41.0975, -80.5051), in western Pulaski Township. The western edge of the CDP is the Ohio state line.

U.S. Route 422 (Ben Franklin Parkway) forms the southern edge of the CDP; the highway leads southeastward  to New Castle, the Lawrence county seat, and west  to Youngstown, Ohio. Pennsylvania Route 208 passes through the center of New Bedford, leading east  to the village of Pulaski and Interstate 376.

Waters in the community drain northeastward to Deer Creek, an eastward-flowing tributary of the Shenango River, except for the southwesternmost part of the CDP, which drains south to Coffee Run, a tributary of the Mahoning River.

Demographics

References

Census-designated places in Lawrence County, Pennsylvania
Census-designated places in Pennsylvania